Pahari, also known as Pahadi, is a tehsil and panchayat village in Bharatpur district of Rajasthan in India.

References

Cities and towns in Bharatpur district
Braj